The women's 50 metre butterfly event at the 2014 Commonwealth Games as part of the swimming programme took place on 26 and 27 July at the Tollcross International Swimming Centre in Glasgow, Scotland.

The medals were presented by Tony Ward, International Paralympics Committee Technical Delegate and the quaichs were presented by Mike Summers, Chairman of the Falkland Islands Overseas Games Association.

Records
Prior to this competition, the existing world and Commonwealth Games records were as follows.

The following records were established during the competition:

Results

Heats

Semifinals

Finals

References

External links

Women's 050 metre butterfly
Commonwealth Games
2014 in women's swimming